David Ruben Piqtoukun ᑎᕕᑎ ᐱᑐᑯ ᕈᐱᐃᓐ (also known as David Ruben) (born 1950) is an Inuvialuk (Inuit) artist from Paulatuk, Northwest Territories.

Career
One of 15 children, Piqtoukun lived a traditional Inuit life until he was sent away to residential school at age five. In 1972, his brother Abraham Anghik Ruben introduced him to stone carving. He also studied books on art. He attributes the impetus behind making his work to art patron Dr. Allan Gonor from North Battleford, Saskatchewan in 1974. Gonor suggested he use stories Piqtoukun collected in his sculpture. Gonor told Piqtoukun: 
"When you travel north, collect the stories — and from there, you introduce them into your carvings and then you start learning."

In 1975, he started compiling ancestral stories, creating an oral history for himself. It served as a source for his work and a way to re-establish his roots and identity.

Work
His output includes sculpture and prints; the sculptural work is innovative in its use of mixed media. His materials and imagery bring together modern and traditional Inuit stylistic elements in a personal vision. An example of this is his work The Passage of Time (1999), which portrays a angakkuq (shaman) in the form of a salmon moving through a hole in a hand. While shamanic imagery is common in much of Inuit art, the hand in this work is sheet metal, not a traditional material such as walrus ivory, the antler's of caribou or soapstone. Fellow Inuvialuk artist Floyd Kuptana learned sculpting techniques as an apprentice to David Ruben.

Selected exhibitions
In 1996, Piqtoukin re-examined his cultural dislocation caused by residential school in Between Two Worlds: Sculpture by David Ruben Piqtoukun, an exhibition at the Winnipeg Art Gallery (WAG) in Manitoba. The Winnipeg Art Gallery also organized Out of Tradition: Abraham Anghik / David Ruben Piqtoukun: a retrospective exhibition, curated by Darlene Wight. In 2023, Wanda Nanibush, Curator of Indigenous Art for the Art Gallery of Ontario celebrated his work with more than 60 of his sculptures which focused on his material inventiveness and narrative vision. The show was titled Radical Remembrance: the sculptures of David Ruben Piqtoukun. Piqtoukun's work also has been included in many group shows, in Canada and internationally.

Selected public collections
His work is included in public collections such as the National Gallery of Canada, Ottawa; the Art Gallery of Ontario, Toronto; the McMichael Canadian Art Collection, Kleinburg; the Winnipeg Art Gallery; the Robert McLaughlin Gallery and the Staatliche Museum für Völkerkunde, Munich, Germany.

Honours
 1986: Carved an Inukshuk for the first Native Business Summit at the Toronto Convention Centre.
 1989: Appointed to UNESCO's Canadian Committee for the World Decade of Cultural Development.
 2000 - appointed to the Sculptors' Society of Canada, the first Inuit artist to be elected.
 2022 - Governor General's Awards in Visual and Media Arts.

References

Bibliography
 Ada, Michigan. MASTERS OF THE ARCTIC:  An Exhibition of Contemporary Inuit Masterworks. Amway Corporation, 1989

External links

 Entry on the Union List of Artist Names
 Timeline of work; includes "The Passage of Time"
 Biography at Galerie Elca London Artist

Inuit printmakers
Inuit sculptors
1950 births
Inuit from the Northwest Territories
Living people
Piqoukun, David Ruben
Artists from the Northwest Territories
20th-century Canadian sculptors
20th-century Canadian printmakers
Canadian contemporary artists
People from Inuvik
Governor General's Award in Visual and Media Arts winners